Bioparco di Roma is a  zoological garden located on part of the original Villa Borghese estate in Rome, Italy. There are 1,114 animals of 222 species maintained.

History
The zoo was conceived in 1908 to hold exotic animal species for exhibition. Unlike other zoos at the time which mainly worked for scientific criteria, this zoo was designed for the entertainment and amusement of the people. The zoo covered  and was erected in the northern part of the Villa Borghese estate; it was opened on 5 January 1911.

The zoo was designed by Carl Hagenbeck, who had already opened a zoo in Hamburg Stellingen. The park was built in the style of that in Hamburg: ditches and pits instead of bars, and generous green spaces.

This initial success did not hold. Attempts were made to stock the zoo with especially rare and exotic animals. Various park expansions were undertaken and in 1926 a further expansion was planned into the neighboring red deer park. In 1933, the architect Raffaele De Vico began his work in the new areas, which were to hold two main attractions: the large aviary and the reptile house which opened in 1935.

The zoo began to deteriorate, although many areas were renovated and others fully rebuilt. In 1970, the reptile house had to be closed due to its ailing condition; its improvements took about nine years and it was finally re-opened in 1983.

The idea to transform the zoo into a biopark was first suggested in 1994. In 1997, a master plan was produced based on the principles of the Gilman Foundation. In April 1998, the organization Bioparco S.p.A. was established to be financed through the city of Rome with 51%, from Costa Edutainment with 39%, and from Cecchi Gori with 10%.

Animals
As of 2022:
{{hidden begin

List of animals

Mammals
Red-necked wallaby
Big hairy armadillo
Capybara
Patagonian mara
Asian small-clawed otter
Binturong
Meerkat
Eurasian lynx
Persian leopard
Sumatran tiger
Asiatic lion
Eurasian wolf
African wild dog
Fennec fox
Maned wolf
Brown bear
California sea lion
Grey seal
Ring-tailed lemur
Black lemur
Red ruffed lemur
Pygmy marmoset
Cotton-top tamarin
Emperor tamarin
Tufted capuchin
White-collared mangabey
Japanese macaque
Mandrill
Lar gibbon
Chimpanzee
Orangutan
Asian elephant
South American tapir
Southern white rhinoceros
Turkmenian kulan
Grévy's zebra
Hippopotamus
Pygmy hippopotamus
Red river hog
Bactrian camel
Guanaco
Vicuña
Reticulated giraffe
Banteng
European bison
European mouflon
Wild goat
Himalayan tahr
Nile lechwe
Addax
Dama gazelle

Birds
Common ostrich
Emu
Southern cassowary
Greater rhea
Crested guineafowl
Indian peafowl
Common shelduck
Ruddy shelduck
Cape Barren goose
Pied avocet
African penguin
Great white pelican
Eurasian spoonbill
Roseate spoonbill
African sacred ibis
Northern bald ibis
Scarlet ibis
Cattle egret
Marabou stork
White stork
Greater flamingo
Grey crowned crane
Salmon-crested cockatoo
Blue-and-gold macaw
Red-fronted macaw
Abyssinian ground hornbill
Golden eagle
Mountain caracara
Egyptian vulture
Rüppell's vulture
White-backed vulture
King vulture
Tawny owl
Eurasian eagle-owl
Snowy owl

Reptiles
Aldabra giant tortoise
Alligator snapping turtle
Elongated tortoise
Giant musk turtle
Kleinmann's tortoise
Malayan box turtle
Pancake tortoise
Radiated tortoise
Red-footed tortoise
Spider tortoise
Vietnamese pond turtle
Smooth-fronted caiman
Dwarf crocodile
Nile crocodile
Komodo dragon
Blue-tongued skink
Gila monster
Philippine sailfin lizard
Spiny-tailed monitor
Standing's day gecko
Common agama
Rough-scaled lizard
Cuban rock iguana
Madagascan collared iguana
Utila spiny-tailed iguana
Ornate uromastyx
Boa constrictor
Green anaconda
Yellow anaconda
Madagascar tree boa
Pacific ground boa
Carpet python
Central African rock python
Sumatran short-tailed python
Horned viper

Gallery

Notes

External links

Bioparco di Roma on zooinstitutes.com
 
 

Zoos in Italy
Tourist attractions in Rome
Buildings and structures in Rome
Zoos established in 1911